Haren is a town and a former municipality in the northeastern Netherlands located in the direct urban area of the City of Groningen.

Haren is a typical commuting municipality with many wealthy inhabitants. It lies on the northern part of a ridge of sand called the Hondsrug. It contains one of two dolmens in the province of Groningen (in the village of Noordlaren) and the largest botanical garden of the Netherlands called Hortus Haren. The municipality comprises a woodland area called Appèlbergen (east of the village of Glimmen) and a lake called .

Haren was officially mentioned for the first time in 1249.

On 21 September 2012, riots broke out with vandalism and looting in Haren. This was all because of an accidentally public distributed invitation to a birthday party on the social networking site Facebook. The events were called Project X Haren. More than 5000 people showed up and over 30 people were arrested. Damages amounted to more than a million euros.

Population centres 

 Essen
 
 Glimmen
 Haren
 
 
 Noordlaren
 Onnen
 Paterswolde (partly)

The town of Haren contains among others the following residential areas:
 Hemmen 
 Maarwold
 Molenbuurt
 Oosterhaar
 Stationsbuurt
 Voorveld

Transport 
Haren's railway station is Haren railway station.

There are regular bus services to and from Groningen, Assen and Emmen.

Groningen Airport Eelde is nearby, albeit that this airport has a limited number of regular international flight destinations. Leisure flights to different international destinations are scheduled throughout the year.

Politics 
The municipal council of Haren had 17 seats. The table below gives political party and seat counts since 1998.

The last executive board consisted of VVD, PvdA and D66.

References

External links 

Groningen (city)
Former municipalities of Groningen (province)
Populated places in Groningen (province)
Municipalities of the Netherlands disestablished in 2019